Ripon is a single member electoral district of the Victorian Legislative Assembly. It is a rural electorate based in western Victoria. In 1946 the electoral district of Ripon was first contested but then abolished in the 1955 election after being held by Labor for seven of these years. Ripon was re-created in 1976, essentially as a replacement for Hampden and Kara Kara.

Ripon has an area of 16,761 square kilometres. It includes the towns of Amphitheatre, Ararat, Avoca, Bealiba, Beaufort, Borung, Bridgewater on Loddon, Buangor, Cardigan, Carisbrook, Charlton, Clunes, Creswick, Dunolly, Eddington, Elmhurst, Glenorchy, Great Western, Inglewood, Landsborough, Lexton, Lucas, Marnoo, Maryborough, Miners Rest, Moonambel, Newbridge, Snake Valley, St Arnaud, Stawell, Stuart Mill, Talbot, Tarnagulla and Wedderburn. The main population centres are Creswick, Ararat, Maryborough, Avoca, Bridgewater on Loddon, St Arnaud and Stawell. This district is known for agriculture, wine making, timber industries, manufacturing, wool production, paper milling, knitting mills and tourism.

It has been held by the Liberal Party for most of its history; however, it was held by the Labor Party from 1999 to 2014, and from 2022 onwards. The 2018 result was the subject of a legal challenge by the second placed Labor candidate.

In the 2021 redistribution, the boundaries of Ripon moved southeast, losing Donald and Charlton to Mildura, and Stawell to Lowan, and also gaining rural towns to the north, west and southwest of Ballarat from the abolished district of Buninyong. As a result, it is estimated that Ripon would be a Labor marginal seat from results of the 2018 election with a margin of 2.8%.

Members

Election results

References

External links
 Ripon: Victorian Electoral Commission profile

Electoral districts of Victoria (Australia)
1945 establishments in Australia
1955 disestablishments in Australia
1976 establishments in Australia
Shire of Northern Grampians
Shire of Pyrenees
Ararat, Victoria
Golden Plains Shire
Shire of Hepburn
Mount Alexander Shire
Shire of Central Goldfields
Shire of Loddon
Barwon South West (region)